Éric Bélanger (born December 16, 1977) is a Canadian former professional ice hockey player. He played the majority of his professional career as a centre in the National Hockey League (NHL), representing the Los Angeles Kings, Carolina Hurricanes, Atlanta Thrashers, Minnesota Wild, Washington Capitals, Phoenix Coyotes and Edmonton Oilers. He was originally drafted in the fourth round, 96th overall, in the 1996 NHL Entry Draft by Los Angeles.

In 2021, Bélanger was named the first head coach the Trois-Rivières Lions, an expansion team in the ECHL affiliated with the Montreal Canadiens.

Playing career
As a youth, Bélanger played in the 1991 Quebec International Pee-Wee Hockey Tournament with a minor ice hockey team from Orford, Quebec.

On March 3, 2010, the NHL trade deadline, Bélanger was traded to the Washington Capitals in exchange for a second-round pick in the 2010 NHL Entry Draft. In Game 5 of the Capitals' 2010 playoff series against the Montreal Canadiens, Bélanger took a high stick to the mouth from Canadiens defenceman Marc-André Bergeron, which resulted in Bélanger losing nine teeth. Moments after the hit, the game telecast showed Bélanger on the bench removing a loose tooth from his mouth, using just his fingers and a piece of gauze.

Bélanger signed a three-year, $5.25 million contract with the Edmonton Oilers on July 1, 2011. In his first season in Edmonton, however, he set offensive career-lows, scoring just four goals and 12 assists, the lowest totals in both categories in his NHL career.

During the lockout-shortened 2012–13 season, Bélanger suffered a second successive disappointing year going without a goal in 26 games for the Oilers. On July 4, 2013, he was placed on unconditional waivers in order for a compliance buyout from the final year of his contract with the Oilers.

On July 15, 2013, Bélanger left the NHL and signed a one-year contract abroad in Russia with Avtomobilist Yekaterinburg of the Kontinental Hockey League (KHL). He played in just seven games with Avtomobilist in the 2013–14 season, before opting to return to North America and retire from professional hockey on September 25, 2013.

Personal life
Bélanger and Alexandra Morin have two daughters: Oceanne and Lola Pearl.

Career statistics

References

External links

1977 births
Living people
Atlanta Thrashers players
Avtomobilist Yekaterinburg players
Beauport Harfangs players
Bolzano HC players
Canadian ice hockey centres
Carolina Hurricanes players
Edmonton Oilers players
Fredericton Canadiens players
French Quebecers
Sportspeople from Sherbrooke
Lowell Lock Monsters players
Long Beach Ice Dogs (IHL) players
Los Angeles Kings draft picks
Los Angeles Kings players
Minnesota Wild players
Phoenix Coyotes players
Rimouski Océanic players
Springfield Falcons players
Washington Capitals players
Ice hockey people from Quebec
Canadian expatriate ice hockey players in Italy
Canadian expatriate ice hockey players in Russia